Waldbredimus is a commune and small town in south-eastern Luxembourg. It is part of the canton of Remich, which is part of the district of Grevenmacher.  The commune's administrative centre is Trintange.

, the town of Waldbredimus, which lies in the centre of the commune, has a population of 376.  Other towns within the commune include Ersange and Trintange.

Population

References

External links
 

Communes in Remich (canton)
Towns in Luxembourg